Samuel Wood Bryant (May 24, 1877 – November 4, 1938) was an admiral in the United States Navy.

Biography
Bryant was born in Washington, Pennsylvania, on May 24, 1877. He attended Bryant School and the Pittsburgh Academy (the predecessor of the University of Pittsburgh) before receiving an appointment to the United States Naval Academy in May 1893. Though he resigned the appointment soon thereafter, Bryant secured another in 1896 and returned to the Naval Academy to complete the course. He also served on  before returning to the Naval Academy.

Graduating in June 1900, he then served the two years at sea as required by law at the time before being commissioned as an ensign. During that interval, he served briefly on  before reporting on board the converted yacht  on September 1. It was late in this assignment, on August 7, 1902, that Bryant received his commission as an ensign. On September 19, 1902, he was detached from Illinois for a short tour of duty as a watch and division on board . That assignment concluded with the year and Ens. While serving on Preble, he was promoted to lieutenant (junior grade) on August 21, 1905 and to full lieutenant on September 11, 1905.

In the fall of 1907, Lt. Bryant returned to the Naval Academy as a navigation instructor and remained there almost three years. After being detached in June 1910, he joined . On October 28, 1912, at the rank of lieutenant commander, he assumed command of Yankton, where he remained until May 31, 1913. Ordered to the Naval War College in Newport, Rhode Island, he pursued the short course until October 4 when he transferred to the Naval Radio Station in Norfolk, Virginia. There, he took up duty as assistant to the superintendent on November 10.

Continuing in command of Allen after the United States entered World War I in April 1917, Bryant was promoted to commander on June 22, 1917. In December 1917, however, he was appointed an aide on the staff of the Commander, U.S. Destroyer Flotillas Operating in European Waters. He served in that capacity until mid-August 1918, whereupon he was promoted to captain on August 15, 1918. Capt. Bryant returned to the United States to fit out . On November 4, 1918, he was appointed to command the destroyers based at Naval Station Norfolk, which he did until February 7, 1919, when he was transferred to command of Flotilla B and destroyers based at Naval Station Charleston.

In June of that year Capt. Bryant received orders to Washington, D.C. for duty in the Office of the Chief of Naval Operations with the Director of Naval Communications. In addition, he left these assignments temporarily in December 1922 to serve as an assistant to the naval advisor to the American delegate to the International Commission on the Rules of Warfare at the Hague in the Netherlands.

Returning to Division 39 and McCormick early in 1923, he resumed those commands until the following fall. Detached from Division 39 on November 17, Capt. Bryant went back to the Office of Naval Communications, where he served as assistant director from December 11, 1923 to May 31, 1924. He then returned to the Naval War College, and, after completing the course in May 1925, served on the staff there until July 1926. After that, he went to sea again, commanding  for two years, before starting another tour of duty on the Naval War College staff in July 1928.

In June 1930, he became chief of staff to the Commander, Scouting Fleet.

During the 24 months in which he served in that position, Scouting Fleet was redesignated Scouting Force. Detached early in the summer of 1932, he reported for duty in the Office of the Chief of Naval Operations on July 7, 1932, as officer-in-charge of the War Plans Division. Near the end of that assignment, on February 18, 1934, he was promoted to rear admiral. In July 1934, RAdm. Bryant received orders to break his flag afloat as the Commander, Battleship Division 2, Battle Force, and did so on September 4, 1934. He remained so employed until March 30, 1935, when he became chief of staff to the Commander in Chief, United States Fleet, in which capacity he served until August 29, 1935.

Hospitalized for more than a year, he was discharged from the Naval Hospital, San Diego, on December 15, 1936, and, on March 1, 1937, was transferred to the retired list by reason of physical disability. RAdm. Bryant died in Asheville, North Carolina, on November 4, 1938, and was buried in Arlington National Cemetery on November 7, 1938.

Namesake
In 1943, the destroyer  was named in his honor.

References

 Bryant , Dictionary of American Naval Fighting Ships, Naval Historical Center, Department of the Navy.

External links
Samuel W. Bryant Notebook, 1893-1896 MS 181 held by Special Collections & Archives, Nimitz Library at the United States Naval Academy

1877 births
1938 deaths
People from Washington, Pennsylvania
United States Navy rear admirals (upper half)
United States Naval Academy alumni
Naval War College alumni
United States Navy personnel of World War I
Burials at Arlington National Cemetery
Recipients of the Navy Cross (United States)
Military personnel from Pennsylvania